Cormocephalus turneri is a species of centipede in the Scolopendridae family. It is endemic to Australia, and was first described in 1901 by British zoologist Reginald Innes Pocock.

Distribution
The species is found in Western Australia, South Australia and Victoria.

Behaviour
The centipedes are solitary terrestrial predators that inhabit plant litter, soil and rotting wood.

References

 

 
turneri
Centipedes of Australia
Endemic fauna of Australia
Fauna of Western Australia
Fauna of South Australia
Fauna of Victoria (Australia)
Animals described in 1901
Taxa named by R. I. Pocock